In the field of physical security, security lighting is lighting that intended to deter or detect intrusions or other criminal activity occurring on a property or site. It can also be used to increase a feeling of safety. Lighting is integral to crime prevention through environmental design. A 2019 study in New York City found that the provision of street lights, an important type of security lighting, resulted in a "36 percent reduction in nighttime outdoor index crimes."

Planning considerations 
Security lighting to prevent intrusions may be counter-productive. Turning off lights halved the number of thefts and burglary in Övertorneå Sweden. 

A test in West Sussex UK showed that adding all-night lighting in some areas made people there feel safer, although crime rates increased 55% in those areas compared to control areas and to the county as a whole.

Bright, unshielded floodlights often prevent people from noticing criminal activity, and help criminals see what they are doing.

While adequate lighting around a physical structure is deployed to reduce the risk of an intrusion, it is critical that the lighting be designed carefully as poorly arranged lighting can create glare which actually obstructs vision.
Studies  have shown that many criminals are aware of this effect and actively exploit it.
The optimal design will also depend on whether the area will be watched directly by humans or by closed-circuit television, and on the location of the observers or cameras.

Security lighting may be subject to vandalism, possibly to reduce its effectiveness for a subsequent intrusion attempt. Thus security lights should either be mounted very high, or else protected by wire mesh or tough polycarbonate shields. Other lamps may be completely recessed from view and access, with the light directed out through a light pipe or reflected from a polished aluminium or stainless steel mirror. For similar reasons high security installations may provide a stand-by power supply for their security lighting.

Some typical considerations include:

 Reduce and prevent glare and situations mentioned above
 Shielded or full cut-off (FCO) lamp housings which conceal the bulb could be used, which should direct light onto the ground or target and away from observers. These lights should send no light above 80 degrees from the nadir. Lighting should be bright enough, and not "as bright as possible". In many cases a good rule of thumb is 0.5 watts per square metre (0.05 watts per square foot). This might need to be increased in complex environments, but conversely can be reduced in very open environments. Multiple lamps of moderate power instead of a few powerful lamps will reduce glare, provide more even illumination with reduced pools of shadow, and provide some redundancy if one lamp's bulb blows out or develops a bad ballast.
 Prevent malicious tampering or interference. This means that besides the lamp itself, the entire circuit from the source (electric company or generator), through the wires, to the lamp and back should be protected.
 Luminaires should be accessible so that the maintainer can replace blown bulbs as quickly as possible and clean the luminaires periodically. However they should be protected or somehow made inaccessible to tampering.
 Ensure the electric meter box is locked or inaccessible, or else power the lights from a different line.
 Control and power lines, where outside or vulnerable, should be either buried well underground (in conduits preferably) or at a height of at least 8 metres (about 24 feet).
 Ideally multiple circuits should be used to prevent an accidental or malicious short or cut causing all illumination to fail.

Use 

Security lighting can be used in residential, commercial, industrial, institutional, and military settings. Some examples of security lighting include floodlights and low pressure sodium vapour lights. Most lights intended to be left on all night are high-intensity discharge lamps as these have good energy efficiency, thus reducing the cost of running a lamp for such long periods.

A disadvantage of low pressure sodium lamps is that the colour is pure yellow, so the illuminated scene is seen without any colour differentiation. Consequently, high pressure sodium vapour lamps (which are still yellowish, but closer to golden white) are also used, at the cost of greater running expenses and increased light pollution. High pressure sodium lamps also take slightly longer to restrike after a power interruption.

LED-based security lighting is becoming increasingly popular, due to its low electrical consumption (compared to non-LED lighting technologies), long lifespan, and options for different color spectrum ranges.

Other lights may be activated by sensors such as passive infrared sensors (PIRs), turning on only when a person (or other mammal) approaches. PIR sensor activation can increase both the deterrent effect (since the intruder knows that he has been detected) and the detection effect (since a person will be attracted to the sudden increase in light). Some PIR units can be set up to sound a chime as well as turn on the light. Most modern units have a photocell so that they only turn on when it is dark.

To reduce light pollution, the International Dark-Sky Association recommends the use of downward-facing security lights that preserve and protect the night time environment.

During the South African energy crisis increased rates of metal theft, house breaking and robberies were reported in areas effected by the loss of security lighting due to a loss of electricity in some urban areas.

Limitations 
An important limitation to the usefulness of security lighting is the simple fact that it is only useful at night. This is particularly significant for home owners because, contrary to a widespread myth, most household burglaries occur during the day, when the occupants are away at work or shopping.

As with any lighting, security lighting can reduce night vision, making it harder to see into areas that are unlit or are in shadow. Non-uniform illumination may also interfere with surveillance systems, as the wide dynamic range of security cameras may have difficulty adjusting to the changes in light intensity.

See also 
 Access control
 Environmental design
 Light pollution
 Physical Security
 Security
 Security engineering

References 

Lighting
Security
Architectural lighting design